The 1971 Milan–San Remo was the 62nd edition of the Milan–San Remo cycle race and was held on 19 March 1971. The race started in Milan and finished in San Remo. The race was won by Eddy Merckx of the Molteni team.

After the ceremony, Merckx immediately left for Belgium to place the flowers received on the coffin of Jean-Pierre Monseré. The then UCI world champion perished a few days earlier during a preparation race for Milan-San Remo.

General classification

References

1971
1971 in road cycling
1971 in Italian sport
1971 Super Prestige Pernod